The Nord 260, built in prototype form as the Max Holste MH.260 Super Broussard, ("Super Bushranger"), was a turboprop-powered, uprated version of the piston-engined Max Holste MH.250 Super Broussard, that was further developed into the Aérospatiale N 262.

Design and development
In 1957, Avions Max Holste began work on a twin-engined follow on to its successful Broussard single-engined utility aircraft. The new aircraft, the Max Holste MH.250 Super Broussard, was a high-wing cantilever monoplane powered by two  Pratt & Whitney R-1340 radial engines and could accommodate 17–22 passengers. The sole MH-250 made its first flight on 20 May 1959.

Max-Holste developed the MH.250 into the turboprop-powered MH.260, to meet a perceived market for a replacement for the DC-3 and for feeder-liner services. Like the MH.250, the MH.260 was a high-wing aircraft with a square-section fuselage, which was of all-aluminum construction. The aircraft had a retractable tricycle undercarriage, with the main wheels retracting into fuselage-mounted fairings. Control surfaces were fabric covered. The aircraft was powered by two Turbomeca Bastan engines. 

The prototype MH.260, powered by two  Bastan IIIs, first flew on 29 July 1960. The prototype was re-engined with  Bastan IVs in October 1960. The construction of a batch of 10 MH.260s was started with a French government subsidy, and a collaboration arrangement agreed with Nord Aviation, but financial problems at Max Holste led to the programme being taken over by completely by Nord, with production aircraft known as Nord 260s. Only nine production Nord 260s were completed, with the tenth aircraft remaining unflown and used as a source of spare parts. Production was switched to the more advanced Nord 262 development.

Operational history
Three Nord 260s were briefly operated under a lease agreement by the Norwegian airline Widerøe before being returned to Nord, while the French domestic airline Air Inter also evaluated the Nord 260. No commercial orders followed, however, although Air Inter later ordered the Nord 262. Five Nord 260s were delivered to the Centre d'essais en vol (CEV), the French flight test establishment, being used for experiments or as transports supporting the CEV's operations.

Variants
MH.250 Super Broussard
 Piston-engined light transport. One prototype built.
MH.260 Super Broussard
 Turboprop powered derivative of MH.250, initially powered by Bastan III turboprop and later by more powerful Bastan IV engines. One built.
Nord MH.260
Ten Bastan IV-powered production aircraft were ordered by the French government, but only nine were completed.

Operators

 CEV

Widerøe - Three aircraft leased

Specifications (Nord 260)

References

Further reading

External links

 Civil registrations of Nord 260 aircraft
Max Holste MH-260 'Super Broussard'
Plane Pictures.net
Airliners.net Nord N-260

1960s French airliners
MH.260
260
High-wing aircraft
Aircraft first flown in 1960
Twin-turboprop tractor aircraft